Electric Chubbyland: Popa Chubby Plays Jimi Hendrix is a live and studio album by Popa Chubby recorded in tribute to Jimi Hendrix. The concert part was recorded in Middletown, New York at the Corner Stage, February 10–11, 2006. The studio part, recorded in 2006 at the Serpentine Studio in Central Valley, includes "San Catri", an instrumental piece written by Popa Chubby in the style of Jimi Hendrix.  The album was re-released in 2007 by Blind Pig Records.  It includes "Fire" in place of "Hey Joe".
The cover was drawn by the French artist Frédéric Loumagne who plays in Evil Country Jack a surfin'trashmetal band.

Track listing
All songs written by Jimi Hendrix, except where noted.

CD 1 (Live)

CD 2 (Live)

CD 3 (Studio)

Band
Popa Chubby: vocals, Guitar
A.J. Pappas: Bass guitar
Chris Reddan: drums

Jimi Hendrix tribute albums
2006 live albums
Live blues albums